Kenogama Lake is a lake in Itasca County, in the U.S. state of Minnesota. The lake stands to the east of Pennington, north-west of Lake Winnibigoshish.

See also 

 List of lakes in Minnesota

References 

Lakes of Minnesota
Lakes of Itasca County, Minnesota